Double Crossed is the debut solo album by Jim Diamond, released in 1985. The album features Diamond's first three solo singles, "I Should Have Known Better", "I Sleep Alone at Night" and "Remember I Love You".
The album was dedicated to Diamond's father who had recently died. Diamond would later write "Hi Ho Silver" as a tribute song to his father. "Hi Ho Silver" was featured on Diamond's second solo album Desire for Freedom. The album was reissued on 23 March 2009 through Cherry Pop Records.

Track listing
All tracks composed by Jim Diamond and Chris Parren; except where indicated.

Side One
"Double Crossed"
"I Sleep Alone at Night"
"After the Fire"
"I Should Have Known Better" (Diamond, Graham Lyle)
"Stumblin' Over"
Side Two
"Remember I Love You" (Diamond, Graham Lyle)
"New Generation"
"Co-Operation"
"She Is Woman"
"I'm Yours"

Personnel
Jim Diamond - vocals
Colin Pincott - guitar 
Earl Slick - guitar on "Co-Operation" and "Impossible Dream"
John McKenzie - bass
Chris Parren, Paul "Wix" Wickens - keyboards
Simon Kirke - drums
Martin Ditcham - percussion
Dick Morrissey - saxophone on "Double Crossed", "After the Fire" and "She Is Woman"
Graham Lyle - acoustic guitar on "I Should Have Known Better"
Pip Williams - additional guitar and guitar solo on "Stumblin' Over"
Zoot Money - Hammond organ on "I'm Yours"
Technical
Eric "ET" Thorngren - remix
Brian Griffin - photography

References

1985 debut albums
Jim Diamond (singer) albums
A&M Records albums
Albums produced by Pip Williams